Good Hope Lutheran Church is a historic church in Clark County, South Dakota. It is situated on U.S. Route 1 near the community of Vienna, South Dakota. The Gothic Revival style church was built in 1894 and was added to the National Register in 2002.

References

Lutheran churches in South Dakota
Churches on the National Register of Historic Places in South Dakota
Gothic Revival church buildings in South Dakota
Churches completed in 1894
Churches in Clark County, South Dakota
National Register of Historic Places in Clark County, South Dakota